Buforania is a genus of grasshoppers in the tribe Catantopini from Australia.

Species
Species include:
 Buforania crassa
 Buforania rufa

References 

 Sjöstedt. 1920. Results of Dr E. Mjöberg's Swedish scientific expeditions to Australia 1910–1913. 20. Acridiodea. Ark. Zool. 12(20):61

Acrididae genera
Orthoptera of Australia
Taxa named by Bror Yngve Sjöstedt